Prochoros Kydones (c. 1330 – c. 1369), Latinized as Prochorus Cydones or Prochorus Cydonius was an Eastern Orthodox monk, theologian, and linguist. An advocate of Western Aristotelian thought, his translation of Latin Scholastic writings, brought him into conflict with Hesychasm, the leading school of Byzantine mystical theology, and its most vigorous defender, Gregory Palamas.

Life 
Born in the Byzantine city of Thessalonica, Prochoros entered the Great Lavra, a monastery on Mount Athos at a young age, and was eventually ordained a hieromonk. He was greatly influenced by Western Scholasticism.  He collaborated with his brother Demetrios Kydones in translating Thomas Aquinas' monumental Summa Theologiae. Prochoros also made Greek translations of the works of Augustine of Hippo and the 6th-century philosopher Boethius.

Prochoros' own treatise, De essentia et operatione Dei (“On the Essence and Activity of God”), was a condemnation of the mystical theology of Hesychasm, propagated by Gregory Palamas. The Synod of Constantinople in 1368 condemned both of the brothers Kydones as heretics, and Prochoros was deposed from the priesthood. The chief source for Prochoros' life is a pair of polemical addresses by Demetrios, eulogizing his brother and denouncing Patriarch Philotheus Kokkinos, who had been responsible for their condemnation. He died at Mount Athos.

See also 
 Palamism
 Byzantine scholars in Renaissance
 List of Macedonians (Greek)

1330 births
1369 deaths
14th-century Byzantine monks
Medieval Athos
Eastern Orthodox monks
Greek Christian monks
Anti-Hesychasm
People excommunicated by the Greek Orthodox Church
Byzantine Thessalonian writers
Latin–Greek translators
14th-century Byzantine writers
14th-century Greek writers
14th-century Greek educators
People associated with Mount Athos
People associated with Great Lavra